The Calgary Roughnecks are a lacrosse team based in Calgary playing in the National Lacrosse League (NLL). The 2019 season is the 18th in franchise history.

Final standings

Regular season

Playoffs

Roster

See also
2019 NLL season

References

Calgary
Calgary Roughnecks seasons
Calgary Roughnecks